The 2021 Antalya Open is a men's tennis tournament played on hard courts. It is the 4th edition of the event, and part of the ATP Tour 250 series of the 2021 ATP Tour. It takes place in Antalya, Turkey, from January 7 to 13.

Points and prize money

Point distribution

Prize money 

*per team

Singles main-draw entrants

Seeds

 Rankings are as of January 4, 2021.

Other entrants
The following players received wildcards into the singles main draw:
  Altuğ Çelikbilek 
  Marsel İlhan
  Ergi Kırkın

The following players received entry from the qualifying draw:
  Adrian Andreev
  Matthias Bachinger
  Pavel Kotov
  Dimitar Kuzmanov
  Alex Molčan
  Michael Vrbenský

Withdrawals 
Before the tournament
  Marco Cecchinato → replaced by  Kacper Żuk
  Borna Ćorić → replaced by  Tristan Lamasine
  Lloyd Harris → replaced by  Nicola Kuhn
  Benoît Paire → replaced by  Andrea Arnaboldi
  Jannik Sinner → replaced by  Malek Jaziri
  João Sousa → replaced by  Hugo Grenier
During the tournament
  Hugo Grenier

Doubles main-draw entrants

Seeds

 Rankings are as of January 4, 2021.

Other entrants
The following pairs received wildcards into the doubles main draw:
  Umut Akkoyun /  Mert Naci Türker
  Tuna Altuna /  Altuğ Çelikbilek

Withdrawals 
Before the tournament
  Sander Arends /  Matwé Middelkoop → replaced by  Luca Margaroli /  Florin Mergea
  Matteo Berrettini /  Jannik Sinner → replaced by  Denys Molchanov /  Aleksandr Nedovyesov
  Tomislav Brkić /  Aisam-ul-Haq Qureshi → replaced by  Ivan Sabanov /  Matej Sabanov
  Lloyd Harris /  David Pel → replaced by  Jiří Veselý /  Tristan-Samuel Weissborn
  Benoît Paire /  Stefano Travaglia → replaced by  Harri Heliövaara /  Emil Ruusuvuori

Champions

Singles 

  Alex de Minaur def.  Alexander Bublik, 2-0 ret.

Doubles 

  Nikola Mektić /  Mate Pavić def.  Ivan Dodig /  Filip Polášek, 6–2, 6–4

References

External links 
Official website 

Antalya Open
Antalya Open
Antalya Open
Antalya Open